Khigh Alx Dhiegh (  or  ; born Kenneth Dickerson; August 25, 1910 – October 25, 1991) was an American television and motion picture actor of Anglo-Egyptian Sudanese ancestry, noted for portraying East Asian roles. He is perhaps best remembered for portraying villains, in particular his recurring TV guest role as Chinese agent Wo Fat on Hawaii Five-O (from the pilot in 1968 to the final episode in 1980), and brainwashing expert Dr. Yen Lo in 1962's The Manchurian Candidate.

Life and death
He was born Kenneth Dickerson in Spring Lake, New Jersey. Dhiegh stated his mother was "Chinese, Spanish, English, and Egyptian" and his father was "Italian, Portuguese, and Zulu"; he was raised in New York City, living in all the boroughs except Staten Island. He moved to Arizona in 1977.

Dhiegh died on October 25, 1991, at Desert Samaritan Hospital of Mesa, Arizona, from kidney and heart failure.

Career
In the early 1930s, Dhiegh was asked by a customer at his mother's bookshop to understudy the role of a butler in Noël Coward's Design for Living, which led to his long career in acting, producing, and directing.

Performance
On Broadway, Dhiegh's credits include The Teahouse of the August Moon and Flower Drum Song. Off-Broadway, he received an Obie Award in 1961 for playing Schlink in In the Jungle of Cities.

He also starred in the short-lived 1975 TV series Khan! as the title character. In 1988, he was featured as Four Finger Wu in James Clavell's Noble House television mini-series.

In 1965, Dhiegh recorded and released an album on Folkways Records, entitled St. John of the Cross: Volume II, a collection of poems of St. John.

Philosophy
Besides his acting endeavors, Dhiegh was active in Taoist philosophy, writing a number of books on the subject, including The Eleventh Wing. Dhiegh credited his "life long dear friend Chao-Li Chi" with sparking his interest in the I Ching and Taoism, starting in 1935. In 1971, he founded the Taoist Sanctuary (now the Taoist Institute) in Hollywood, California. At the time, he was living in the San Fernando Valley.

Dhiegh also had a doctorate in theology, and in his later years, was the rector for a Taoist sanctuary in Tempe, Arizona called 'Inner Truth Looking Place.' He held weekly services and sponsored many 'Tea Ceremonies' in the Phoenix metro area. Dhiegh picked up jewelry making as a hobby in the 1970s, later selling pieces to help support the sanctuary. One of his last interviews was on One World in 1990, where he presented the concept of World Citizenry and its benefit to mankind.  Dhiegh's contributions to Taoism are discussed in some detail in the book Taoism for Dummies (John Wiley and Sons Canada, 2013).

Select filmography

Notes

References

External links

Khigh Dhiegh roles and background at TV Acres
Khigh Dhiegh Album Details at Smithsonian Folkways

American male television actors
American male film actors
Male actors from New Jersey
American Taoists
People from Spring Lake, New Jersey
American people of English descent
American people of Egyptian descent
American people of Sudanese descent
1910 births
1991 deaths
20th-century American male actors